Plasmodium girardi is a malaria parasite affecting lemurs. It was described in Madagascar in 1951 in Eulemur rufus, the red-fronted lemur. It is named after Georges Girard, head of the Institut Pasteur in Antananarivo. It is one of four Plasmodium species described in lemurs before 1975; others were Plasmodium foleyi and Plasmodium lemuris.

References 

girardi
Malaria